Shahrin Saberin is a Singaporean footballer who plays for Tanjong Pagar United Fc as a defender.

He was called up to the 2016 SOS Squad to face Selangor FA. He is also the captain of the Garena Young Lions and Singapore U-22. He was one of the nominees for the Sleague Young Player of the Year 2016.

Club career

Home United
Sharin was part of the Singapore Armed Forces Football Club (SAFFC) U16 in 2010 after failing to make the cut to the Youth Olympic Games Squad. In 2012, he went back to SAFFC youth set up but this time with the U-18 team. After a successful season in 2012, he was promoted to the Warriors Prime League team. Singapore Cubs, which were then the Singapore U-20, was his next destination in 2014. The Singapore U-20 is a club under FAS and which was coached by former Technical Director of FAS, Slobodan Pavkovic, In 2015, he signed for the Home United Prime league team because of National Service (NS) and was trusted by the coach then, Philippe Aw to get his debut and eventually get more playing time in the Sleague. His first game was against the Courts Young Lions.

Young Lions
Sharin signed for Garena Young Lions in 2017. He was the captain of that team.

Home United
Sharin returned to Home United after the loan from Garena Young Lions ended.

Geylang International
He moved to the Eagles for the 2019 season, seeking regular action.

Career statistics 
As of 11 Oct 2021

References

External links
Singapore - S. Saberin - Profile with news, career statistics and history - Soccerway

Singaporean footballers
1995 births
Living people
Association football defenders
Competitors at the 2017 Southeast Asian Games
Geylang International FC players
Young Lions FC players
Home United FC players
Singapore youth international footballers
Southeast Asian Games competitors for Singapore